The Miracle of Empel (Milagro de Empel in Spanish) was an unexpected Spanish victory on December 8, 1585, near Empel, in the Netherlands, as part of the Eighty Years' War, in which a surrounded Spanish force won against an enemy who exceeded them largely in number.

Background 
In 1585 the Dutch revolt raged in full force. Tensions ran high and cities changed powers. In March of that year, Nijmegen had chased away the protestant magistrate to put itself under the protection of the Prince of Parma. In addition, the prince captured Antwerp on August 17. Incidentally, he had already had plans in 1579 to seize that famous city on the Scheldt, but for practical reasons he then directed his offensive against Maastricht, which city fell into his hands after a siege of several months.

After the adventure with the Duke of Anjou, support from France, itself going through a time of internal conflict, had become a highly problematic matter. English support offered more prospects, all the more so as Queen Elisabeth would be pleased to put her foot in the way of Philip II of Spain, especially if she could press that foot firmly into Dutch soil. On August 20, 1585, she concluded the Treaty of Nonesuch with the States General, which provided for the sending of an army of 6,000 men, while receiving Flushing and Brielle as collateral for the costs to be incurred. The Duke of Leicester would do this job for her.

The young Maurice, Prince of Orange, stadtholder of Holland since November 1, 1585, was faced with a difficult task.

The battle 
After the campaign of 1585, the Governor of Spanish Netherlands and commander of the Spanish troops Alesander Farnese, Prince of Parma decided to go into winter quarters in the Northern Dutch territory. The troops of Karl von Mansfeld occupied the area around 's-Hertogenbosch. Some 3000-4000 men of the Spanish Tercio, including Juan del Águila, under Maestre de Campo Francisco Arias de Bobadilla were stationed on Bommelerwaard, which was supposed to be rich enough to support these troops through the winter. But all the farmers had left the island, taking their livestock with them.

To make the situation of the hungry Spanish troops even worse, Dutch commander Philip of Hohenlohe-Neuenstein arrived with a strong land force and 100 ships. The Dutch leader offered an honorable surrender to the Spaniards but the response was resolute: «Los infantes españoles prefieren la muerte a la deshonra. Ya hablaremos de capitulación después de muertos.» (English: "Spanish soldiers prefer death to dishonor. We will talk about surrender after death"). Philip of Hohenlohe-Neuenstein breached the dikes of Bommelwaard, forcing the Spanish back over the river Maas to higher ground around Empel. From there they were unable to reach 's-Hertogenbosch, because the terrain was flooded and guarded by Hohenlohe's fleet. The island was attacked also by artillery fire coming from a fort, at the other side of the river. The situation for the Spanish looked desperate.

On learning of this situation, Farnese had gathered a relief column and supplies then rushed to their rescue. Meanwhile, a Spanish soldier who was digging a trench around the church supposedly commented "this is more likely to be my grave than a trench". As he dug, he found a painting representing Mary of the Immaculate Conception. Bobadilla interpreted the discovery as a sign from God, and had the painting raised next to the Spanish flag for veneration.

That night, a sudden further drop in temperature started to freeze the shallow waters of the flooded countryside. This made it possible for the Spanish troops to attack the rebels and burn their ships. The next day, they charged and conquered the Dutch fort located along the river. Admiral Hohenlohe-Neuenstein responded by saying: "In my opinion, it seems that God is Spanish to work so great a miracle [for them]. Five thousand Spaniards who were also five thousand soldiers […] and five thousand devils."

That same day, Mary of the Immaculate Conception was proclaimed patroness of the Spanish Tercios of Flanders and Italy.

In the 19th century 
On December 8, 1854, Pope Pius IX defined the dogma of the Immaculate Conception of the Blessed Virgin Mary. In 1892 Maria Cristina of Austria (Maria Christina Désirée Henriette Felicitas Rainiera von Habsburg-Lothringen, und Österreich), Queen Regent of Spain, proclaimed Mary of the Immaculate Conception patroness of the entire Spanish Infantry.

References

Bibliography

External links 
  Article on the site of the Army Museum of The Netherlands

Empel
1585 in the Dutch Republic
History of Catholicism in Spain
16th-century military history of Spain
Eighty Years' War (1566–1609)
Empel
Empel
Empel
Empel
Events in 's-Hertogenbosch